In mathematics, a Dieudonné module introduced by ,  is a module over the non-commutative Dieudonné ring, which is generated over the ring of Witt vectors by two special  endomorphisms  and  called the Frobenius and Verschiebung operators. They are used for studying finite flat commutative group schemes.

Finite flat commutative group schemes over a perfect field  of positive characteristic  can be studied by transferring their geometric structure to a (semi-)linear-algebraic setting. The basic object is the Dieudonné ring 

, 

The Dieudonné module functor in one direction is given by homomorphisms into the abelian sheaf  of Witt co-vectors. This sheaf is more or less dual to the sheaf of Witt vectors (which is in fact representable by a group scheme), since it is constructed by taking a direct limit of finite length Witt vectors under successive Verschiebung maps , and then completing.

Dieudonné theory exists in a somewhat more general setting than finite flat groups over a field. Tadao Oda's 1967 thesis gave a connection between Dieudonné modules and the first de Rham cohomology of abelian varieties, and at about the same time, Alexander Grothendieck suggested that there should be a crystalline version of the theory that could be used to analyze -divisible groups. Galois actions on the group schemes transfer through the equivalences of categories, and the associated deformation theory of Galois representations was used in Andrew Wiles's work on the Shimura–Taniyama conjecture.

Dieudonné rings

.

 

Dieudonné modules and groups

Special sorts of modules over the Dieudonné ring correspond to certain algebraic group schemes.

Examples

Dieudonné–Manin classification theorem

It describes the structure of Dieudonné modules over an algebraically closed field  up to "isogeny". The category of such modules is semisimple, so every module is a direct sum of simple modules. The rational number  is called the slope of the module.

The Dieudonné module of a group scheme

If  is a commutative group scheme, its Dieudonné module  is defined to be , defined as  where  is the formal Witt group scheme and 
 is the truncated Witt group scheme of Witt vectors of length . 

The Dieudonné module gives antiequivalences between various sorts of commutative group schemes and left modules over the Dieudonné ring .
Unipotent affine commutative group schemes correspond to  modules that are -torsion.
-divisible groups correspond to -modules that are finitely generated free -modules, at least over perfect fields.

Dieudonné crystal

A Dieudonné crystal is a crystal  together with homomorphisms   and  satisfying the relations  (on ),  (on ). They play the same role for classifying algebraic groups over schemes that Dieudonné modules play for classifying algebraic groups over fields.

References

.

External links

Algebraic groups